Beyle can refer to:

Given name
 Beyle Schaechter-Gottesman (1920–2013), Yiddish poet and songwriter

Surname
 Abdirahman Duale Beyle (b. 1955 or 1956), Somali economist and Foreign Minister of Somalia
 Marie-Henri Beyle (1783–1842), French writer, better known by his pen name Stendhal

See also
 Bayle (disambiguation)